Big Red Machine is the debut studio album by American musicians Aaron Dessner and Justin Vernon as Big Red Machine. Dessner is most famous for being a founding member, instrumentalist, songwriter, and producer for The National, and Vernon for being the front man of Bon Iver. The majority of the album was recorded in Dessner's shed studio in the Hudson Valley.

Track listing

Personnel

Musicians 
 Aaron Dessner - drum machine, synthesizer, acoustic guitar, electric guitar, piano, mellotron, bass, songwriting, production
 Justin Vernon - vocals, electric guitar, bass, synthesizer, baritone guitar, songwriting, production
 Brad Cook - production, bass, omnichord, synthesizer

Additional musicians 
 Jonathan Low - engineering
 JT Bates - drums (all tracks)
 Bryce Dessner - orchestration (6-8), electric guitar (7)
 Bryan Devendorf - drum machine (2-3, 6-7)
 Phoebe Bridgers - additional vocals (3)
 Kate Stables - additional vocals (5, 8-9)
 Richard Reed Parry - additional vocals (2, 5, 9)
 Lisa Hannigan - additional vocals (1, 3, 5, 8-10)
 Andrew Broder - additional vocals (3)
 Camilla Staveley-Taylor - additional vocals (3, 6)
 Emily Staveley-Taylor - additional vocals (3, 5, 8-10)
 Jessica Staveley-Taylor - additional vocals (3, 5, 8-10)
 Zoe Randell - additional vocals (8-10)
 Steve Hassett - additional vocals (8-10)

Charts

References

2018 debut albums
Big Red Machine (band) albums
Jagjaguwar albums
Albums produced by Aaron Dessner